Jingyu Lin is a Chinese-American physicist and engineer working in the field of wide bandgap semiconductors and photonic devices. She is a co-inventor of MicroLED. In 2000, the husband-wife research team led by Hongxing Jiang and Jingyu Lin proposed and realized the operation of the first MicroLED and passive driving MicroLEDmicrodisplay. In 2009, their team and colleagues at III-N Technology, Inc. and Texas Tech University realized and patented the first active driving MicroLED microdisplay in VGA format by heterogeneously integrating MicroLED array with Si CMOS active-matrix driver. MicroLED display market is expected to hit US$24,307.4 Million by 2027.

The single-chip high-voltage DC/AC LEDs via on-chip integration of mini- and MicroLED arrays developed by their team in 2002 have been widely commercialized for general solid-state lighting and automobile headlights.

Under the support of DARPA-MTO’s SUVOS, CMUVT, DUVAP, and VIGIL programs, their research team contributed to the early developments of III-nitride deep UV emitters and detectors and InGaN energy devices in the United States. These include the prediction and confirmation that Al-rich AlGaN deep UV emitters emit light in the transverse-magnetic (TM) mode, the demonstration of the first UV and blue photonic crystal LEDs (PC-LEDs), one of the first to demonstrate conductivity control in Al-rich AlGaN and AlN deep UV avalanche photodetectors with an ultrahigh specific detectivity. Supported by ARPA-E, their research team has realized thermal neutron detectors based on ultrawide bandgap semiconductor hexagonal boron nitride with a record high detection efficiency among solid-state detectors.

Education 
She obtained PhD in physics in 1989 from Syracuse University under the guidance Arnold Honig. She received her BS in physics in 1983 from SUNY Oneonta.

Career 
Currently, she is a co-director of the Nanophotonics Center and is the inaugural Linda F. Whitacre endowed chair and Horn Distinguished Professor of Electrical & Computer Engineering within the Edward E. Whitacre Jr. College of Engineering at Texas Tech University (TTU). To be designated a Horn Professor is the highest honor received by a Texas Tech faculty member. In 2008, she along with her husband Hongxing Jiang (a Horn Distinguished Professor, co-director of the Nanophotonics Center and the inaugural Edward Whitacre endowed chair of Electrical & Computer Engineering at TTU), relocated their research team to TTU from Kansas State University where she was a professor of physics.

Honors and awards 
Elected fellow of the National Academy of Inventors, 2019

Elected fellow of the American Association for the Advancement of Science, 2018

Elected fellow of the SPIE - the international society for optics and photonics, 2017

Elected fellow of the Optical Society of America, 2016

Elected fellow of the American Physical Society, 2012

References 
https://spie.org/about-spie/advocacy/women-in-optics/women-in-optics-planner/2016-wio-planner/jingyu-lin?SSO=1

Living people
Year of birth missing (living people)
Place of birth missing (living people)
American electronics engineers
American women engineers
Texas Tech University faculty
Kansas State University faculty
Syracuse University alumni
State University of New York at Oneonta alumni
21st-century American inventors
American women academics
21st-century American women
Fellows of SPIE
Fellows of the American Association for the Advancement of Science
Fellows of the American Physical Society
Fellows of Optica (society)